Gammaroporeia is a monotypic genus of crustaceans belonging to the monotypic family Gammaroporeiidae. The only species is Gammaroporeia alaskensis.

The species is found in Western America.

References

Amphipoda
Monotypic crustacean genera